Hits & Favorites, also known as ABC AC, was a 24-hour music format produced by Cumulus Media Networks (now Westwood One). ABC AC combined a highly researched Adult Contemporary music mix targeted to women aged 25–49.

Citadel Broadcasting purchased ABC Radio Networks (now Cumulus Media Networks) and the ABC owned-and-operated radio stations from The Walt Disney Company in February 2006. The Citadel acquisition has been completed and did not include Radio Disney or the ESPN Stations. Citadel merged with Cumulus Media on September 16, 2011.

History
Starstation, as it was formerly known, was part of the original Satellite Music Network, with studios in Mokena, Illinois, outside of Chicago. After being acquired by ABC/Capital Cities, the format moved to studios in Dallas, Texas, along with many of the other SMN formats.

Weekday hosts
Frank Welch (also hosts Saturday 80's Show)
Richard Stevens
Mike Wade
Mary Rose
Donny Osmond (midday)

Weekend hosts
Milli Mills
Steve Eberhart
Sheryl Shannon
Scott Reese
Debbie Douglass
Areka Spencer

Former hosts
Citadel Media Networks had a mass firing on November 12, 2009.  Those let go from the AC format include: Peter Stewart – the 20-year program director of the format, Tom Kennedy – assistant program director, Brian Kane – night time host and webmaster, and Lori St. James – longtime morning show co-host.  St. James's co-host Richard Stevens now hosts a solo show on the format.
John McCarty hosted the Saturday 70's (later changed to 80's) Show for about a decade on the format.  He died suddenly at the age of 55 on May 26, 2008, due to complications with diabetes.  John was concurrently employed as the local operations manager for Traffic.com in Dallas, and had worked in local Dallas-Fort Worth radio since 1979.  McCarty began his radio career in his hometown of Hopkinsville, KY in 1968.
Bob Leonard was the original morning man on the format, and spent nearly 25 years with the ABC Radio Networks.  Leonard did many of the smooth-voiced promos for The Star Station as well.  Next, Leonard became a host on the short-lived financial online talk radio site mn1.com, then afternoon news anchor at WBAP-AM in Fort Worth-Dallas before relocating to Miami, Florida, where he worked as a traffic reporter.  He has since retired due to health reasons.

The format officially ceased broadcasting in mid-July 2014, after a final merger with Westwood One.  No personalities were retained from this format.  Affiliates now carry Westwood One's AC Total format.

Other former hosts have included:
Tom Rodman
Ron Britain
John Calhoun
Steve Eberhart
John Lacy
Karen Williams
Rocky Martini
Robert G. Hall
Dean Richards
Tim Spencer
"VLJ"

Trivia
Richard Stevens is a former Hollywood Squares announcer and is the brother of another Squares announcer and American Top 40 host, Shadoe Stevens.

Sample hour of programming
"Dancing In The Dark" – Bruce Springsteen
"Home" – Michael Bublé
"This I Promise You" – 'N Sync
"Dream Weaver" – Gary Wright
"Kokomo" – The Beach Boys
"This Love" – Maroon 5
"The Long and Winding Road" – The Beatles
"Because Of You" – Kelly Clarkson
"Without You" – Harry Nilsson
"Bad Day" – Daniel Powter
"Dreams" – Fleetwood Mac
"Takes a Little Time" – Amy Grant
"We've Only Just Begun" – The Carpenters
"Live Like You Were Dying" – Tim McGraw
"Another Day in Paradise" – Phil Collins

See also
Satellite Music Network

Mainstream adult contemporary radio stations in the United States
Westwood One
Defunct radio networks in the United States
Former subsidiaries of The Walt Disney Company
Defunct radio stations in the United States